Encholirium is a genus of plants in the family Bromeliaceae, subfamily Pitcairnioideae. The entire genus is endemic to Brazil. The genus name is from the Greek “enchos” (spear) and “leiron” (lily).

This genus occur exclusively in arid, rocky conditions.  Some species of Encholirium are limited in number and have been the focus of conservation efforts.  These plants, which have been observed being pollinated by bats, are commonly confused with Dyckia.

Species
 Encholirium agavoides Forzza & Zappi
 Encholirium ascendens Leme
 Encholirium belemii L.B. Smith & R.W. Read 
 Encholirium biflorum (Mez) Forzza 
 Encholirium brachypodum L.B. Smith & R.W. Read 
 Encholirium bradeanum L.B. Smith 
 Encholirium ctenophyllum Forzza & Zappi
 Encholirium disjunctum Forzza 
 Encholirium diamantinum Forzza
 Encholirium eddie-estevesii Leme & Forzza 
 Encholirium erectiflorum L.B. Smith 
 Encholirium gracile L.B. Smith 
 Encholirium heloisae (L.B. Smith) Forzza & Wanderley 
 Encholirium horridum L.B. Smith 
 Encholirium irwinii L.B. Smith 
 Encholirium longiflorum Leme 
 Encholirium luxor L.B. Smith & R.W. Read 
 Encholirium lymanianum E. Pereira & Martinelli 
 Encholirium magalhaesii L.B. Smith 
 Encholirium maximum Forzza & Leme 
 Encholirium pedicellatum (Mez) Rauh 
 Encholirium pulchrum Forzza, Leme & O.B.C.Ribeiro
 Encholirium reflexum Forzza & Wanderley 
 Encholirium scrutor (L.B. Smith) Rauh 
 Encholirium spectabile Martius ex Schult. & Schult.f.  
 Encholirium subsecundum (Baker) Mez 
 Encholirium vogelii Rauh

References

External links
FCBS Encholirium Photos
BSI Genera Gallery photos

Pitcairnioideae
Endemic flora of Brazil
Bromeliaceae genera